The Master: An Adventure Story is a 1957 science fiction adventure novel by English author T. H. White.

Plot summary
It involves two children, Judy and Nicky, and their dog Jokey, who are stranded on Rockall, an extremely small, uninhabited, remote rocky islet in the North Atlantic Ocean. They find that it is hollow and inhabited by a mysterious person who aims to take over the world.

Characters

The captives' family
Nicky: He is resistant to telepathy, and the Master hopes to train him as a successor.
Judy: She is more susceptible to the Master's mind control.
Jokey: Judy's mongrel dog, about the size of a Skye Terrier.
The Duke: The twins' father. His estate in England called Gaunt's Godstone.
The Duchess: The twins' mother, first name "Fanny."
Mr. Pierrepoint: The Duchess's brother, the twins' uncle.

The captors' team
The Master: 157 years old, he communicates by telepathy, which he can also use to control people's minds. He has invented a kind of vibrator-ray to take over the world.
Mr. Blenkinsop ("the Chinaman"): His Chinese name means "Golden Tiger in the Tea Forest", but he took the name Blenkinsop while studying at Oxford University. The Master befriended him at first because he found the Chinese language superior to English for expressing his ideas, but now he and Blenkinsop communicate by telepathy.
Dr. Totty McTurk: Originally a ship's surgeon named Jones. Although probably Welsh, he affects various accents (Irish, Scottish, Cockney and Australian) when talking with the children.
Pinky or Pinkie: Sometimes referred to as "the negro" or "the blackamoor," he is the island's cook. He is mute, his tongue having been cut out. He is a follower of Gandhian nonviolence.
Squadron-Leader Frinton: Pilot of the helicopter which carries mail and supplies between Rockall and Ireland. He tries to help the children escape.

Major themes
Like White's better-known work, The Once and Future King (1958), The Master deals with moral questions of killing, war and peace, and response to evil.

Allusions

References to other works
The novel makes several allusions to the play The Tempest by William Shakespeare and begins and ends with quotations from the play.
In trying to impress upon the children the meaning of the Master's great age, Mr. Frinton says:

References to actual history, geography and current science
In the opening chapter, White delineates a brief history of the exploration of Rockall, starting with legends of St. Brendan and Atlantis and continuing with visits by Martin Frobisher (1578), Basil Hall (1810), the Helen (1824),  (1862), the Royal Irish Academy (1896), Jean-Baptiste Charcot (1921), and Michael Bizony (1948). He mentions the British annexation of Rockall (1955) and says it may have been precipitated by the events of The Master (rather than the novel being inspired by the annexation).
The novel refers to post-World War II events and public figures including US President Dwight D. Eisenhower, Soviet Premier Nikita Khrushchev and British Prime Minister Anthony Eden.
Mr. Frinton compares the Master's age with that of other purportedly long-lived people: Old Tom Parr, Henry Jenkins, and the Countess of Desmond.

Television adaptation
In 1966, Southern Television made a six-part television dramatisation starring Adrienne Posta and Paul Guess, with Olaf Pooley as the Master.

See also

 1957 in literature
 List of novels

Footnotes

External links
 
1957 book review by Maurice Richardson
1966 Southern Television dramatisation

1957 British novels
1957 children's books
British adventure novels
British children's novels
British science fiction novels
Children's science fiction novels
Fictional mad scientists
Novels set in subterranea
Jonathan Cape books
Novels by T. H. White
Novels set in the Outer Hebrides
Rockall
British novels adapted into television shows